Chryss Viliko (born 25 December 2000) is a New Zealand rugby union player. She plays for the Blues Women in the Super Rugby Aupiki competition.

Biography 
Viliko attended Onehunga High School in Auckland. She made her debut for Auckland in the Farah Palmer Cup in 2018. She also plays for Marist in the Auckland club competition. She missed most of the 2021 Farah Palmer Cup season due to her recovery from an ACL knee reconstruction.
Viliko attend a Black Ferns High Performance camp in October 2021.

On 3 November 2021, Viliko was named in the Blues squad for the inaugural Super Rugby Aupiki competition. She was named on the Blues bench for their first game against Matatū, they won 21–10. She also featured in their 0–35 thrashing by the Chiefs Manawa in the final round.

In July 2022, Viliko attended the Black Ferns trial in Pukekohe. She played for the Rawata team against Ngalingali at the Navigation Homes Stadium.

References

External links 

 Blues Profile

2000 births
Living people
New Zealand female rugby union players